Murmur of the Hearts is a 2015 Hong Kong-Taiwanese romantic drama film directed by Sylvia Chang. It was released on April 10, 2015 in Taiwan and April 30, 2015 in China. It was screened in the Contemporary World Cinema section of the 2015 Toronto International Film Festival.

Plot 
Yu-mei (Isabella Leong) and Yu-nan (Lawrence Ko) were born on the small and isolated Green Island off the east coast of Taiwan. They grew up listening to bed stories about a mermaid told by their mother (Angelica Lee). Now a painter based in Taipei, Yu-mei is in a rocky relationship with aspiring boxer Hsiang (Joseph Chang). She is also seeing a counselor for her anger towards her mother, which is making her see hallucinations and have trouble sleeping. It is revealed that her mother took her and left the island when she was a child, eventually operating a restaurant in Taiwan and becoming another man's mistress in Taiwan. After her mother died, she overheard her father saying he doesn't want to hear anything about her or her mother. To make matters worse, she is currently pregnant and she thinks Hsiang doesn't want children with her. While she is battling her own emotions, Hsiang is desperately trying to make it to the boxing competition. But he is losing sight in one of his eyes and when the fact is discovered by his coach, he is pulled off the matches and disqualified from being a boxer. One day, while the couple is having a meal in a restaurant, Yu-mei is overcome with emotions when she recognizes the restaurant as the one her mother used to own. She finally confesses that she is pregnant and Hsiang is grim but holds her hand. Meanwhile, at the same time, Yu-nan is now a travel agent working between Green Island and Taiwan. He too is troubled by memories of his mother, thinking she abandoned him because she liked Yu-mei better. As the film progresses, they all manage to let go of their demons and come to peace on their own. Years pass and Yu-nan stumbles into Yu-mei's daughter Hai, who is all grown up, and Hsiang in a bookstore where Yu-mei is doing a signing. Hai shows Yu-nan the book her mother authored and when he reads it, he recognizes it as the story of his childhood. Yu-nan meets her and they smile, having reunited at long last.

Cast
Isabella Leong as Yu-mei
Joseph Chang as Hsiang
Lawrence Ko as Yu-nan 
Angelica Lee as Yu-mei and Yu-nan's mother
Wang Shih-hsien as Boxing coach
Julian Chen as Father

Reception
The film has grossed NT$5.46 million at the Taipei box office and, by May 4, 2015, had earned $835k at the Chinese box office.

References

External links

2015 romantic drama films
Hong Kong romantic drama films
Taiwanese romantic drama films
Films directed by Sylvia Chang
2010s Hong Kong films
2010s Mandarin-language films